Port Hacking High School is a high school situated in the Sutherland Shire, in the South-East region of Sydney, New South Wales. It was opened in 1959 and was the first comprehensive high school within the Sutherland Shire Council that provides education up to and including the Higher School Certificate level.

References 

Public high schools in Sydney
Sutherland Shire
1959 establishments in Australia
Educational institutions established in 1959